Gongora quinquenervis is a species of orchid, and the type species of the genus Gongora. This species forms a complex for several ill-defined species. It is found in Colombia, Peru, Ecuador, Venezuela, Guyana and Trinidad

References

External links 

Orchids of Colombia
Orchids of Ecuador
Orchids of Guyana
Orchids of Peru
Orchids of Trinidad
Orchids of Venezuela
quinquenervis